DN73 is a national road in Romania which links Pitești with Brașov. It is a high-traffic road and the preferred route for trucks. Near Câmpulung the road crosses the Southern Carpathians along the Dâmbovița River. The road crosses several tourist-stop villages, such as Rucăr, Dâmbovicioara, and Bran.

External links

Roads in Romania